Pierre Benoit (30 April 1824 – 26 August 1870) was a member of the Legislative Assembly of Quebec.

He practised his profession as a notary in Saint-Rémi, Quebec from 1846 to 1861. He was elected to the Legislative Assembly of the Province of Canada for Napierville in a by-election in 1862, representing the Parti rouge; he was defeated in 1863.

He was elected to the first Legislative Assembly of Quebec in the 1867 general election for the Quebec Liberal Party in Napierville.  He died in office.

References
 

1824 births
1870 deaths
Quebec Liberal Party MNAs
Members of the Legislative Assembly of the Province of Canada from Canada East
People from Longueuil